The 2012 Estonian Figure Skating Championships took place between 16 and 18 December 2011 in Premia. Skaters competed in the disciplines of men's singles, ladies' singles, and ice dancing on the senior and junior levels. The results were used to choose the teams to the 2012 World Championships and the 2012 European Championships.

Senior results

Men

Ladies

Ice dancing

Junior results

Men

Ladies

Ice dancing

External links
 2012 Estonian Figure Skating Championships

Estonian Figure Skating Championships
Figure Skating Championships
Estonian Figure Skating Championships, 2012
2011 in figure skating